Doggett's Repository of Arts (c. 1821-1825) was an art gallery in Boston, Massachusetts, located at 16 Market Street. Its proprietor, John Doggett, was a gilder and framer with a retail shop near the gallery (nos.18 and 20 Market Street). The gallery exhibited originals and copies of works by European masters such as Titian, Rembrandt, Watteau, and David, and a few American artists, such as Thomas Sully, Gilbert Stuart, Samuel F.B. Morse, Rembrandt Peale, and William Dunlap. By July 1825, the gallery was converted into retail space for Doggett's frame, mirror and carpet business.

Exhibitions
 1821
 November - "Collection of cabinet paintings. ... Many of them have adorned the galleries of the Duke of Buckingham, Marquis of Stafford, Cardinal Woolsey, Lord Fife, Henry Hope, &c." 164 works, including (copies of) Rembrandt's "Achilles;" Titian; Watteau's "Garden at Versailles;" Sully's "Taking of Major Andre." Auctioned by Blake & Cunningham, Nov. 22
 1822
 March - Gilbert Stuart's portraits of "the five presidents of the United States:" George Washington, John Adams, Thomas Jefferson, James Madison, and James Monroe
 October - William Dunlap's Christ rejected by the high priest and elders
 1823
 February - Samuel F.B. Morse's view of the U.S. House of Representatives
 April - Thomas Sully's The Passage of the Delaware
 August - Egyptian mummy: a "curious relic of antiquity, together with the sarcophagi in which it was contained, when taken from the catacombs of ancient Thebes"
 August - Rembrandt Peale's Court of Death
 December - Thomas Sully's Capuchin Chapel
 December - "Stollenwerk's mechanical and picturesque panorama": "a commercial city, with its active citizens, merchants, mechanicks, labourers, beggars and promenaders, together with ships, boats, &c. are seen at one view, and put in motion by machinery"
 1824
 April - "French and Italian engravings, just imported from France;" auctioned by J.L Cunningham
 July - "Paintings by some of the old masters, in handsome gilt frames, some of which were recently imported from London. ... Titian, Rubens, De Heem, Ruysdaal, Vanderveld, Brughel, Wouvermans;" also marble busts of Rubens and Raphael. Auctioned by J.L Cunningham on July 16.
 October - Jacques-Louis David's Cain meditating the death of his brother Abel

Image gallery

References

Further reading

 

1821 establishments in Massachusetts
1825 disestablishments in Massachusetts
Economic history of Boston
19th century in Boston
Cultural history of Boston
Defunct art museums and galleries in Boston
Financial District, Boston
Government Center, Boston
Art galleries established in 1821
Art galleries disestablished in 1825